Feroze Butt (27 January 1942 – 5 September 2014) was a Pakistani cricket umpire. He stood in one Test match, Pakistan vs. New Zealand, in 1990 and four ODI games between 1985 and 1994.

See also
 List of Test cricket umpires
 List of One Day International cricket umpires

References

External links

1942 births
2014 deaths
Cricketers from Delhi
Pakistani Test cricket umpires
Pakistani One Day International cricket umpires
Pakistani cricketers
Karachi cricketers